Emily Smith is an English children's writer. Her books are aimed at young readers, mainly writing for Young Corgi Books (a Transworld Publishers imprint) and Orchard Books. Her first children's book, Astrid, the au pair from Outer Space won the silver medal in the 6-8 age group, at the Nestlé Smarties Book Prize 1999. The Shrimp won the 6-8 age group Nestlé Smarties Book Prize Gold medal in 2000.

Published books  

 The Good Manners Prize (HarperCollins Educational, 1996)

Stories contributed to original anthologies:
 "The Friendship Necklace", Incredibly Creepy Stories, ed. Tony Bradman (Corgi, Oct 1997), pp. 45–62
 "Across Three Millennia", Sensational Cyber Stories, ed. Tony Bradman (Doubleday UK, Nov 1997), pp. 81–96

Published by Young Corgi Books, a Transworld Publishers imprint, for children ages about 6 to 10 years:
Astrid, the au pair from Outer Space (1999)
The Shrimp (2001)
Annie and the Aliens (2002); hardcover published by Andersen Press, 2001
Robomum (2003)
Patrick the Party-Hater (2004)
Joe v. The Fairies (2005)

Published by Orchard Books, for children ages about 9 years and up:
What Howls at the Moon in Frilly Knickers? (2001)
When Mum Threw Out the Telly (2003)
A Stain on the Stone (2006)

Awards 
 Gold award in the 6–8 age group of the 2001 Smarties Awards for The Shrimp.
 Silver prize in the 6–8 age group of the 1999 Smarties Awards for Astrid, the au pair from Outer Space.

References

External links 
 Emily Smith's official children's author website
 Emily Smith at Random House
 
 WorldCat search emily smith corgi and emily smith orchard

English children's writers
English fantasy writers
Living people
British women children's writers
Women science fiction and fantasy writers
English women novelists
20th-century English novelists
20th-century English women writers
Place of birth missing (living people)
Year of birth missing (living people)
21st-century English novelists
21st-century English women writers
20th-century British short story writers
21st-century British short story writers